Expo Hall is an indoor arena located at the Florida State Fairgrounds in East Lake-Orient Park, Florida. It is used primarily as an exhibition hall during the Florida State Fair, but has also hosted concerts and sporting events.

The South Florida Bulls men's basketball team used Expo Hall as their main home arena for the 1979–80 season before the on campus USF Sun Dome opened.

The Tampa Bay Rowdies of the defunct North American Soccer League used Expo Hall for 8 of their 16 home games during the 1983–84 indoor season. At that time the arena's capacity was 9,200. This would also prove to be the league's final indoor campaign before suspending operations following the 1984 outdoor season.

The arena was more famously used by the National Hockey League's Tampa Bay Lightning during the team's inaugural season of 1992-1993. The facility's seating capacity of 10,425 proved too small for the Lightning, and the team relocated to the ThunderDome in St. Petersburg for three seasons, until their permanent home, Amalie Arena, was built in downtown Tampa.

In 1994 the expansion Tampa Bay Tritons of Roller Hockey International played for one season at Expo Hall before folding. Mark Messier was the owner of the club.

The facility currently hosts graduation ceremonies for Hillsborough County's public high schools.

Noteworthy entertainers to perform in concert at Expo Hall include Robert Plant, REO Speedwagon, Cheap Trick, No Doubt, Green Day, Nine Inch Nails, Peter Frampton, Stone Temple Pilots, Yes, George Michael, Santana, Beastie Boys, Alabama, Motörhead, and The Smashing Pumpkins.

References

External links 
 Florida State Fair - official site

Indoor ice hockey venues in Florida
Indoor arenas in Florida
Sports venues in Tampa, Florida
Music venues in Florida
Tampa Bay Rowdies sports facilities
Defunct National Hockey League venues
Defunct indoor soccer venues in the United States
Music of Tampa, Florida
North American Soccer League (1968–1984) indoor venues
1977 establishments in Florida
Sports venues completed in 1977
Florida State Fair
Former South Florida Bulls sports venues
Tampa Bay Lightning